My Year of Flops (subtitled The A.V. Club Presents One Man's Journey Deep Into the Heart of Cinematic Failure) is a 2010 book by film critic Nathan Rabin based on his columns on the website The A.V. Club.

Background
Starting in 2007, Rabin set out to provide a revisionist look at critical and commercial cinematic failures at a weekly basis.

Criteria
Rabin's critique for each film fall into three categories: Fiasco, Failure and Secret Success.

Notable films featured in the book
Waterworld (1995)
The Cable Guy (1996)
Last Action Hero (1993)
Freddy Got Fingered (2001)
The Scarlet Letter (1995)
Heaven's Gate (1980)
Even Cowgirls Get the Blues (1993)
Exit to Eden (1994)
Lolita (1997)
Elizabethtown (2005) (the first "file case" where he coined the termed "manic pixie dream girl")
Joe vs. The Volcano (1990)
The Rocketeer (1991)
Rent (2005)
Santa Claus: The Movie (1985)
Skidoo (1968)
The Conqueror (1956)
Pinocchio (2002)

Aftermath
In 2011, Rabin started My World of Flops to include TV shows and music-related flops starting with Aaron Sorkin's Studio 60 on the Sunset Strip and ending with the 2016 comedy film The Brothers Grimsby before opening his own personal site called "Nathan Rabin's Happy Place".

See also
List of films considered the worst
Cult film
Mystery Science Theater 3000-similar in content
Cinephilia
The Onion

Further reading 
'My Year Of Flops: An Introduction' (archived)

References

External links

Books about film
2010 non-fiction books
Film and video fandom
Books of film criticism
Charles Scribner's Sons books